The Seattle Ballers were a basketball team based in Seattle, Washington. The team competed in the Junior Basketball Association (JBA), a league created for high school and junior college players as an alternative to the National Collegiate Athletic Association (NCAA).

History 
The JBA was first announced on December 20, 2017, when media personality LaVar Ball said to Slam magazine that he would create a professional league targeted at high school graduates and fully funded by his sports apparel company Big Baller Brand. The league held tryouts in Seattle in April 2018, initially selecting only four players onto the Seattle Ballers team. Among them was Semaj Booker, who had previously made national headlines as a runaway child at age nine. During an episode of Ball In The Family, it was revealed that joining alongside Booker were Ismael Muhammad, Joe Saterfield Jr., and Erwin Weary Jr. At its tryout in Houston, Texas at a later date, the league brought in three-star recruit and former Southern Utah commit Jerell Springer to the Seattle Ballers squad. On June 16, 2018, the JBA announced former UCLA basketball player Charles O'Bannon as the Ballers' head coach.

2018 roster

References

External links 
JBA official website

Junior Basketball Association teams
Basketball teams in Seattle
Basketball teams in the United States
Basketball teams established in 2018
2018 establishments in Washington (state)